Elder is an unincorporated community in Oconee County, in the U.S. state of Georgia.

History
A post office called Elder was established in 1886, and remained in operation until 1904. A variant name was "Goshen".

References

Unincorporated communities in Oconee County, Georgia
Unincorporated communities in Georgia (U.S. state)